Entertainment Rights PLC (formally known as Sleepy Kids PLC and SKD Media PLC) was a British multinational mass media and entertainment conglomerate that specialized in TV-shows and cartoons, children's media, films, and distribution. In May 2009, the company was acquired by Boomerang Media and merged into its own subsidiary Classic Media.

History

Early history
In 1989, "Sleepy Kids" was founded by Martin and Vivien Schrager-Powell. It was created in order to produce Midnight Patrol: Adventures in the Dream Zone (Potsworth and Co. in the United Kingdom), a children's animated series. Schrager-Powell's business partner was Hanna-Barbera. Within months of its founding, Sleepy Kids became a public company. It produced Dr. Zitbag's Transylvania Pet Shop and Budgie the Little Helicopter.

In December 1998, the company merged with The Richard Digance Card Company, Clipper Films and Ridgeway Films, and after these mergers, the company was renamed SKD Media PLC.

In 1999, the company acquired Siriol Productions. In July, SKD purchased the Southampton-based Boom! Boom!, the property owners of the Basil Brush character.

Rebranding and expansion as Entertainment Rights
In October, SKD Media announced that they would acquire fellow independent business Carrington Productions International. In November, SKD announced to change their name to Entertainment Rights.

Under their new name, Entertainment Rights continued on with their expansion. Their first acquisition after the name change came in April, with the worldwide pre-sale rights to then-upcoming GMTV series Cubeez. In August, the company signed a co-production deal with Disney-owned Buena Vista Home Entertainment for their Magical Mystical Merlin series, later renamed as Merlin the Magical Puppy, where BVHE would distribute the series on home media worldwide except in the US and Japan.

In February 2001, the company acquired all international TV and home video rights to Barbie in the Nutcracker from the toy company Mattel, which was set for a Winter 2001 release. In March, The company purchased United Kingdom-based children's distributor Link Entertainment, which also included its licensing subsidiary Link Licensing. Another purchase came in November, when stop-motion animation company Woodland Animations, well known for producing Postman Pat was acquired.

After the success of Barbie in the Nutcracker, Mattel and Entertainment Rights agreed for a worldwide deal to distribute the second movie - Barbie as Rapunzel, in April 2002, excluding the US.

In 2004, Entertainment Rights acquired Tell-Tale Productions and rights to most of the in-house Filmation library from Hallmark Entertainment.

At the end of 2004, Entertainment Rights employed 95 people. In the 2005 financial year, Entertainment Rights' revenue was £12.4 million. The company bid for Chorion but the offer was rejected.

In 2005, Siriol Productions came under new management. The company was renamed "Calon". Most of the rights to completed productions were kept by Entertainment Rights. In October 2005, the company expanded their Barbie licensed deal with Mattel to include three more movies. It was further extended again in September 2006.

Purchase of Classic Media and Losses (2007-2009)

The deal would bring Classic Media's own IPs, including the Bullwinkle Studios joint-venture with Jay Ward Productions (Rocky & Bullwinkle, George of the Jungle), the Harvey Comics library (Casper the Friendly Ghost), Lassie, the pre-1974 Rankin/Bass Productions library (including Rudolph the Red-Nosed Reindeer and Frosty the Snowman) and Big Idea Productions' (VeggieTales) to the Entertainment Rights portfolio. The deal also included a stake in the joint-venture children's block/network Qubo (closed 14 years later). The deal was closed on 11 January 2007 and Classic Media became a wholly-owned subsidiary.

Before the deal was completed, both companies announced North American home video distribution and production agreements with Genius Products.

On January 22, 2007,  the company purchased the Where's Wally? franchise.

In December 2008, the company appointed Deborah Dugan, former president of Disney Publishing Worldwide, as its CEO in North America. There had been financial instability within the company.

By January 2009, the company had dismissed one third of its employees. The company's market value decreased from £267 million in March 2007 to £5.5 million. By February 2009, six companies had requested to purchase Entertainment Rights. Also in February 2009, Entertainment Rights was fined £245,000 by the Financial Services Authority for failing to inform shareholders of "a potential $14 million earnings hit in a timely manner".

Administration, new ownership and later history (2009)
On 1 April 2009, Entertainment Rights went into voluntary administration. On the same day, Boomerang Media announced it had acquired all of Entertainment Rights' subsidiaries including Entertainment Rights itself, Big Idea and Classic Media.

On 11 May 2009, Boomerang Media announced that the former British and US subsidiaries of Entertainment Rights would operate as a unified business under the name "Classic Media", while Big Idea would operate under its own name. Boomerang Media was created by former owners of Classic Media until it was sold to Entertainment Rights in 2006.

The Entertainment Rights PLC company was folded on 30 December 2010.

In 2012, Classic Media was acquired by DreamWorks Animation. DreamWorks Animation was then acquired by NBCUniversal in 2016, thus Universal Pictures gaining the rights to most of Entertainment Rights' catalogue of works.

Programme Library

Original programmes
 Potsworth & Co. (1989-1990, as Sleepy Kids, co-produced with Hanna-Barbera and BBC)
 Dr. Zitbag's Transylvania Pet Shop (As Sleepy Kids, co-produced with Fairwater Films, PMMP Productions and Watch It!)
 Budgie the Little Helicopter (As Sleepy Kids, co-produced with HTV and Fred Wolf Films)
 Meeow! (As SKD Media PLC, co-produced with STV, Comataidh Craolaidh Gaidhlig and Siriol Productions)
 Cubeez (2000-2001, co-produced with Cubeez Ltd. and Optical Image Broadcast for GMTV)
 Merlin the Magical Puppy (2002, produced by The Little Entertainment Company)
 The Basil Brush Show (2002–2007; produced by The Foundation)
 Postman Pat (Revival series and Special Delivery Service, 2003–2008, produced by Cosgrove Hall Films)
 Postman Pat and the Greendale Rocket
 Postman Pat and the Pirate Treasure
 Postman Pat Clowns Around
 Postman Pat's Magic Christmas
 Little Red Tractor (2004-2005, Series 1-2 only, produced by The Little Entertainment Company)
 Rupert Bear, Follow the Magic... (2006-2008, produced by Cosgrove Hall Films)
 Fun Song Factory (Revival series, 2004, produced by Tell-Tale Productions)
 Boo! (2005-2006, Series 2 only, produced by Tell-Tale Productions, co-funded and distributed by Universal Pictures)
 BB3B (2005, produced by Tell-Tale Productions)

Archive programmes

Banksia Productions
 The Curiosity Show
 Hot Science
 Kids Down Under
 The Music Shop

Carrington Productions International
 Discworld (co-produced with Channel 4, Cosgrove Hall Films, Egmont Imagination and ITEL)
 Lavender Castle (1999-2000, co-produced with Cosgrove Hall Films)

Filmation
 For a full list of shows, films, shorts and specials, see List of works produced by Filmation.

Hibbert Ralph Entertainment
 The First Snow of Winter (co-produced with Link Entertainment and BBC)
 The Forgotten Toys (both the TV series and the special; co-produced with United Productions, Meridian Broadcasting and Link Entertainment)
 The Second Star to the Left: A Christmas Tale (co-produced with BBC)
 Spider! (later sold to Evergreen Entertainment)

Link Entertainment
 Animal Antics
 Barney (co-produced with Barney Entertainments Ltd)
 Bill the Minder (produced by Bevanfield Films)
 Bug Alert
 Chatterhappy Ponies
 Christopher Crocodile (co-produced with Mixpix and BBC)
 Deep Sea Dick
 Fairy Tales (produced by Bevanfield Films)
 Ethelbert the Tiger (co-produced with Millimages)
 Eye of the Storm (produced by Childsplay Productions and Meridian Broadcasting)
 Grabbit the Rabbit
 Hamilton Mattress
 Jack and Marcel
 Rudyard Kipling's Just So Stories (produced by Bevanfield Films)
 Monster TV (co-produced with BBC)
 The Morph Files (co-produced with Aardman Animations)
 Orm and Cheep
 Pirates (produced by Childsplay Productions and BBC)
 Preston Pig (co-produced with Varga London)
 Siyabonga
 Tales of a Wise King
 The Slow Norris (co-produced with HTV)
 The Spooks of Bottle Bay (co-produced with Fugitive/Playboard Puppets and Carlton Television)
 The Treacle People (co-produced with Fire Mountain Productions)
 Teddybears (co-produced with United Productions)
 There's A Viking in My Bed (co-produced with BBC)
 Tiny (co-produced with Martin Gates Productions)
 Jane Speakman's Tiny Tales

Martin Gates Productions
 Molly's Gang

Maddocks Animation
 Caribou Kitchen
 The Family-Ness
 Jimbo and the Jet Set
 Penny Crayon

Siriol Productions Ltd
The Blobs
Hilltop Hospital
Romuald the Reindeer

Queensgate Productions
 Stoppit and Tidyup (co-produced with CMTB Animation)
 The Trap Door (co-produced with CMTB Animation)

Carrington Productions International
 The Snow Queen
 The Snow Queen's Revenge
 Friendly Monsters
 Jack and the Beanstalk
 The Ugly Duckling

Trumptonshire
 Camberwick Green (co-produced with BBC)
 Chigley (co-produced with BBC)
 Trumpton (co-produced with BBC)

Tube Studios 
 Inuk (TV Series) (co-produced with Canadian Television Fund, CBC, Shaw Broadcast Television Fund, Télé-Québec and APTN)

Woodland Animations
 For a full list of shows and details, see Woodland Animations.

Distribution rights

Transformers
 Transformers: Armada (co-produced with Hasbro, Takara Tomy, Æon, Dangun Pictures, Hangzhou Feilong Animation Ltd, M.S.J. Musashino-Seisakujo, Paramount Domestic Television and SD Entertainment)
 Transformers: Energon (co-produced with Hasbro, Takara Tomy, We've Inc, ACTAS, Inc., A-CAT, Studio Galapagos and TV Tokyo)
 Transformers: Cybertron (co-produced with Hasbro, Takara Tomy, We've Inc, TV Aichi, GONZO, Sun Woo Entertainment and Voice Box Productions)
 Transformers: Animated (co-produced with Hasbro, Takara Tomy, The Answer Studio, MOOK DLE, Studio 4 °C and Cartoon Network Studios)

Miscellaneous
 The Story of Tracy Beaker (2002–2005; co-produced with BBC)
 Short Cuts (2002-2003; co-produced with Burberry Productions)
 Custer's Last Stand-up (co-produced with BBC and RTÉ)
 Dr Otter (co-produced with Red Balloon Productions)
 My Parents Are Aliens (1999-2006; co-produced with Yorkshire Television and ITV)
 Finley the Fire Engine (co-produced with RHI Entertainment)
 Inuk (co-produced with Tube Studios)
 Katie and Orbie (2001-2002; co-produced with Amberwood Entertainment)
 Finger Tips (2001-2004; co-produced with The Foundation)
 The New Adventures of He-Man (co-produced with Jetlag Productions)
 Titch (co-produced with Hutchins Film Company and Yorkshire Television)

Right Entertainment

Right Entertainment was a home video company that released Entertainment Rights' properties on VHS and DVD in the United Kingdom, alongside some acquisitions from third-party companies.

History
ER formed Right Entertainment at the beginning of July 2001, and signed a $500,000 advance UK/Ireland distribution deal with Universal Pictures Video to distribute their releases. Right's release schedule would start off with VHS releases of Barbie in the Nutcracker and existing ER property Cubeez in 2001, followed up with Clifford the Big Red Dog and Casper the Friendly Ghost releases, and DVD release of Barbie following up in 2002. The company also announced an international home video expansion for their properties, beginning with Universal obtaining non-UK/Ireland home video rights to Barbie in the Nutcracker, but ruled out if Universal would distribute other properties outside the UK as well.

Right Entertainment's first product - Barbie in the Nutcracker, was released on VHS on 29 October 2001 to a huge commercial success, which went on to sell 100,000 units within its first week of release. By April 2002, after which the movie was released on DVD as well, 700,000 copies were sold across both formats. This deal later led to home video and TV rights being secured for the sequel - Barbie as Rapunzel.

Right secured home video rights to the CITV arts and crafts series Finger Tips in June 2002 after ER acquired worldwide distribution rights. This was followed up with UK home video rights to Clifford the Big Red Dog the following month as ER already held consumer product rights to the franchise itself.

In April 2004, Right secured UK home video rights to Clifford's Puppy Days.

References

British animation studios
Defunct companies based in London
Mass media companies established in 1989
Mass media companies disestablished in 2009
Entertainment companies established in 1989
Entertainment companies disestablished in 2009
Children's television
DreamWorks Classics
Television production companies of the United Kingdom
1989 establishments in England
2009 disestablishments in England
Companies that have entered administration in the United Kingdom